Geylang is a planning area and township located on the eastern fringe of the Central Region of Singapore, bordering Hougang and Toa Payoh in the north, Marine Parade in the south, Bedok in the east, and Kallang in the west.

Geylang is perhaps best known as a red-light district, particularly the areas along Geylang Road. Geylang is also where one of Singapore's oldest Malay settlements, Geylang Serai, is located. During Ramadan, the neighbourhood is famous for its popular and iconic Ramadan lights and bazaars.

Etymology
The word Geylang is found early in Singapore's history and also in early topographical maps showing marsh and coconut plantations beside and adjacent to the mouth of the Kallang River, home to the Orang Laut (sea gypsies) called orang biduanda kallang who inhabited the area at the time of Raffles' arrival in 1819, and after whom the river is named. Geylang may be a corruption of Kallang. The place name appeared in an 1830 survey map of Singapore as Kilang, but by 1838 was spelled as Kelang, which when pronounced in correct Malay is nearly indistinguishable to the ear from Geylang. However, kilang also means press, mill, or factory in Malay and could be a reference to the presses and mills in the coconut plantations that used to be in the area. Another possible etymological link in the stock vocabulary of the Malay is geylanggan meaning to "twist" or "crush" a reference to the process of extracting the coconut meat and milk used by the locals to thicken curries in Malay-Chinese (Peranakan) cuisine.

Another possible explanation is that Geylang is a corruption of the Malay word 'gelang' which is a type of edible creeper (Portulaca oleracea). This is a plausible explanation for the name because Malays typically name places based on the abundance of certain plant species (e.g. Melaka after the tree species of the same name) or geological formations (e.g. Bukit Gombak based on the comb-like hill summit).

Geography

Location
Grouped under the Central Region, Geylang Planning Area is bordered by Hougang and Toa Payoh in the north, Kallang in the west, Marine Parade in the south, and Bedok in the east. Beginning in the north and moving in a clockwise direction, the boundaries of Geylang are made up of MacPherson Road, Airport Road, Eunos Link, Jalan Eunos, Still Road, Koon Seng Road, Dunman Road, the Geylang River, Mountbatten Road, Sims Way, and the Pan Island Expressway (PIE).

Geylang New Town as defined by the Housing and Development Board (HDB) sits within the Geylang Planning Area.

Subdivisions
Geylang Planning Area is made up of five "subzones", as officially defined by the Urban Redevelopment Authority (URA).

History

The development of Geylang can best be observed along the main trunk road, Geylang Road, that leads westwards towards the city. Micro-businesses founded by Malay, Indian and Chinese entrepreneurs seized start-up opportunities as mechanics in bicycle or motor repair workshops, suppliers of wood for making boats, houses, furniture and as merchants in iron, of floor and roofing tiles, in rubber and later plastics for all kinds of marine, industrial, factory and home use, including the mosaic of temples, mosques and churches in Geylang that have its roots serving local worshippers in search of spirituality and the divine.

One of the distinctive hallmarks of Geylang architecture is the preservation of its shophouses used by the clan (kinship) associations, set up as a (first) point of contact for newcomers in the migrant wave between 1840 and 1940 for the purpose of integrating the newcomers into the ways and customs of locals. At present, the Geylang neighbourhood accurately reflects demographic changes in Singapore (2011) where out of every four Singaporeans, one is a foreigner (Goh, Mar 2011 paper on PRC Immigrants', Social Work Dept, National University of Singapore).

As a strategic and military outpost for the British, it was important that the sea lanes off the Straits of Malacca were kept free of pirates, and open for shipping. As the British expanded in influence and power, Singapore served East and West interests as a natural deep-harbour destination that played host to the French, Portuguese, Dutch and other European navies and their men. Other seaports in Asia, from Shanghai to Calcutta, also played a role in the traffic of women and girls for prostitution.

Geylang Serai
1900s A terminal for the first tramway in Singapore was then built in Geylang Serai while the farmers staying there already shifted to cultivate other cash crops, including rubber and coconuts. Meanwhile, with the intensified urbanisation, the rural community in Geylang Serai, where the price of land was low, was turned into a suburb.

1940s During the occupation by Japanese in World War 2 (1942 to 1945), Geylang Serai was severely damaged, and the shortages of food that arose afterwards led to the replacement of the plantations of coconut and rubber by those of tapioca, which gave Geylang Serai the name, Kampong Ubi (tapioca in Malay). With the end of Japanese occupation, Geylang Serai saw a rise in population and more areas were occupied. The inflow of more Malays and outflow of Chinese changed the demographic of Geylang Serai, which turned into predominantly a Malay community ever since.

1960s In 1963, the Housing and Development Board (HDB) initiated The Geylang Serai Housing Redevelopment Scheme which was carried out in three phases, investing a sum of 3.8 million SGD for the renewal of the region. Under the scheme, Many HDB flats and new facilities were constructed, including Taj cinema, Concourse, light industrial properties, shopping malls and Geylang Serai market.

1980s the old kampungs in the region vanished and Geylang Serai turned into a modern residential district.

2000s In tandem with the urbanization of the region, the importance of preservation of Malay cultural heritage was recognized by the government. Under the Masterplan of 2008 by the Urban Redevelopment Authority (URA), the development of the Paya Lebar Central, within which Geylang Serai is situated, into a centre characterised with a distinct cultural identity was confirmed. Until now, Geylang Serai market is still one of the busiest and largest wet markets in Singapore, offering many Indian-Muslim and Malay dishes as well as a large variety of spices and ingredient for making of traditional Malay cuisine, such as cinnamon and nutmeg.

Infrastructure
The Geylang area is composed of north and south sections that are divided by Geylang Road which stretches for about three kilometres. Throughout the length of Geylang Road, there are lanes (or "lorongs" in the local Malay language) that extend perpendicularly from the main road. The lanes in the north are given odd numbered names (i.e. Lorong 1, Lorong 3, Lorong 5 and so on), and the lanes in the south are given even numbered names (i.e. Lorong 2, Lorong 4, Lorong 6 and so on).

Partly untouched by urban projects and developments and so far spared by the gentrification process that has changed the face of Singapore since the 1970s, Geylang's combination of shophouse scenery and hectic day and night life, including foreign workers quarters and karaoke lounges provides an alternative view of elements the rest of modern Singapore generally does not have. Shophouses along Geylang Road are protected from redevelopment, and many restaurants have sprung up along this major road. Geylang is also known for its durian shops.

Transport

Roads
The following expressways pass through Geylang:
Pan Island Expressway (PIE) connects Geylang with Changi Airport, Tampines, Bedok, Kallang, Toa Payoh, Clementi, Jurong East, Jurong West and Tuas;
Kallang-Paya Lebar Expressway (KPE) connects Geylang with Kallang, Hougang, Sengkang and Punggol.

Major roads within Geylang Planning Area include Aljunied Road, Kallang Way, Paya Lebar Road, Geylang East Central, Ubi Avenue 2 and Circuit Road.

Trains
There are eight Mass Rapid Transit (MRT) stations that serve Geylang Planning Area:

 Eunos
 Paya Lebar
 Aljunied
 Mountbatten
 Dakota
 MacPherson
 Mattar
 Ubi

Media
 Living in Geylang, a 20-episode drama aired on MediaCorp Channel 8 in 1998.
 Pleasure Factory, a 2007 Singaporean-Thai docudrama film set in Geylang.

References

Further reading
Peter K G Dunlop (2000), Street Names of Singapore, Who's Who Publishing, Singapore, 
Victor R Savage, Brenda S A Yeoh (2003), Toponymics – A Study of Singapore Street Names, Eastern Universities Press, 

 
Central Region, Singapore
Places in Singapore